Anadia pamplonensis, the Pamplona anadia, is a species of lizard in the family Gymnophthalmidae. It is found in Venezuela and Colombia.

References

Anadia (genus)
Reptiles of Colombia
Reptiles of Venezuela
Reptiles described in 1944
Taxa named by Emmett Reid Dunn